Songs from Rabbittland is the fifteenth and final studio album by country artist Eddie Rabbitt. The album was released on April 10, 1998, and contained 17 children's songs, jokes, and stories told by Rabbitt that he wrote for his kids. There were no singles released from this album. This was Rabbitt's last studio album before his death at the age of 56 on May 7, 1998, less than a month after the album was released.

Rabbitt stated that the album was made up of "17 songs, jokes, and stories I wrote for my kids as they were growing up."

Track listing
All tracks were composed by Eddie Rabbitt.
"Hi Kids" - :09  
"Come with Me (Rabbittland)" - 3:02  
"Why, Why, Why" - 2:27  
"Who's That Pullin' on Me?" - 2:07  
"Mr. Eddie & Miss Angela, No. 1" - :32  
"Heat 'Em up, Eat 'Em Up" - :46  
"You Can Do Anything" - 3:06  
"Andrew the Squirrel" - 2:25  
"Mr. Eddie & Miss Angela, No. 2" - :12  
"Woodchuck" - :27  
"Puppy" - 2:04  
"26 Sheep Story" - :57  
"All the Little Animals" - 2:33  
"Friend" - 3:18  
"Mr. Eddie & Miss Angela, No. 3" - :27  
"Can You Tell Me a Story" - 2:21  
"Sleepy Deepy Do" - :51

Personnel
Don Barrett - bass guitar
Lee Garner - acoustic guitar, electric guitar
Eddie Rabbitt - acoustic guitar, lead vocals, background vocals
Gene Sisk - sound effects, keyboards

References

1998 albums
Eddie Rabbitt albums